Yüksel Tohumculuk (Yuksel Seeds) is a Turkish plant breeding company, based in Antalya. It is the largest developer, marketer and producer of vegetable seeds in Turkey.

Yuksel Seeds operates five research and production stations and owns 1,200 hectares of agricultural land and 650 acres of qualified high-tech greenhouses with the presence of advanced R&D activities. The company has a wide chain of distributors worldwide and exports its products to over 40 countries.

Management
The company is run as a family business by seven brothers, the oldest of which, Mehmet, is a founder, general manager and the main breeder of the company. He is also a member of the board of Antalyaspor, a local football club. Mehmet Yüksel was twice selected the successful  entrepreneur of the year (in 2007 and in 2011) by Antalya Industrialists' and Businessmen's Association (ANSIAD).

Social activities
Yuksel Seeds is one of the sponsors of Antalyaspor, a local football club.

References

External links
 Yuksel Seeds Official Webpage

Agriculture companies of Turkey
Plant breeding
Companies based in Antalya
Turkish brands
Companies established in 1996
Biotechnology companies of Turkey